Ferdinand Maximilian of Baden-Baden, Hereditary Prince of Baden-Baden (23 September 1625 – 4 November 1669) was the father of the famous general Louis William, Margrave of Baden-Baden.

Born in Baden-Baden, he was the oldest son of William, Margrave of Baden-Baden and Catharina Ursula of Hohenzollern–Hechingen.
Ferdinand Maximilian of Baden was destined to follow in his father's footsteps as Margrave of Baden-Baden, but he died before his father in a hunting accident.  

Ferdinand Maximilian married in Paris in 1653 Princess Louise of Savoy (1627–1689), aunt of Prince Eugene of Savoy.

The marriage was not successful. Louise Christine of Savoy refused to leave the refined French court and follow her husband to Baden-Baden. Ferdinand Maximilian then abducted his son from Paris and brought him to Baden-Baden.
As a consequence Louis William was not raised by his mother, but by his grandfather's second wife Maria Magdalena of Oettingen-Baldern.

1625 births
1669 deaths
House of Zähringen
Hereditary Princes of Baden-Baden
Heirs apparent who never acceded
Hunting accident deaths
People from Baden-Baden
Accidental deaths in Germany
Sons of monarchs